In 2016, the Front for Change and Concord in Chad (FACT) and the Military Command Council for the Salvation of the Republic (CCMSR) began a rebellion against the Chadian government. From their rear bases in southern Libya, FACT and CCMSR have launched offensives and raids into Northern Chad seeking to overthrow the government of former president Idriss Déby, who had been in power since a December 1990 coup. Other rebel groups are also involved in the insurgency, though to a lesser extent.

Background 

Historically, Chad has suffered from a large number of civil wars, foreign conflicts, and coups since its independence from France in 1958. Idriss Déby seized the Chadian presidency in a military coup in 1990. Since then, he enjoyed backing by both France and China. Déby's government was able to repeatedly defeat rebellions against his rule. Militant opposition groups were eventually driven from the country into exile. After the end of the Chadian Civil War (2005–2010), Chadian insurgents were forced to leave their old bases in Sudan. Many consequently moved into Libya which fell into unrest from 2011 due to the First Libyan Civil War.

In 2014, the Second Libyan Civil War broke out. Several Chadian rebel groups consequently became mercenaries in service of various Libyan factions, receiving money and weaponry to prepare for their return to Chad.

Insurgency

Emergence of new rebel groups and battles for Kouri Bougoudi 
Two new Chadian rebel groups, FACT and the CCMSR, were organized in southern Libya in 2016 and aided local groups in return for money, equipment, and other support. FACT initially became allied to a Misrata-based faction. By 2017, the Chadian intelligence believed that rebels led by Timane Erdimi, a nephew and long-time opponent of Idriss Déby, were gathering weapons in southern Libya.

In July 2017, the CCMSR launched an offensive on Kouri Bougoudi seeking to seize control of the region and its lucrative mines. These assaults were ultimately repelled by the Chadian government although the CCMSR claimed to have launched a second attack in August 2017 which the Chadian government denied took place. In September, Chad severed diplomatic relations with Qatar, accusing it of attempting to destabilize the country. Journalist Ben Taub suspected that this development was related to Qatar harboring Timane Erdimi who was still trying to overthrow Déby.

By fall, fighting between government loyalists and insurgents grew more frequent along the Chadian-Libyan border. Déby responded by relocating hundreds of Chadian soldiers who had been sent to fight against Boko Haram to the north.

On 11 August 2018, CCMSR launched a major attack on the military outpost at Kouri Bougoudi in the Tibesti Mountains, later claiming to have killed 73 and captured 45 soldiers while suffering just 11 casualties (4 dead, 7 wounded). The Chadian government initially attempted to deny that the attack had taken place, and then downplayed its significance. While the CCMSR offered to release its prisoners in return for the release of imprisoned rebel leaders, the Chadian government refused to negotiate with "savage mercenaries, bandits [and] thugs", and instead ordered local miners to abandon their camp at Kouri Bougoudi. The military subsequently retreated from the area on 22 August, leaving it to the CCMSR and illegal miners. From then on, the Chadian Air Force launched several bombing raids in the region, targeting the Kouri Bougoudi mining camp and camel herds, killing several civilians and depriving locals of their livelihood. Meanwhile, the CCMSR continued its attacks against government positions, such as at Tarbou in Tibesti Region (21 September), and Miski in Borkou Region (24 October). Some locals criticised the CCMSR of exploiting and worsening ethnic tensions in the Tibesti Mountains.

Minor rebel incursions 
On 12 January 2019, a Sudanese armed group, the Justice and Equality Movement, crossed the border with Libya with dozens of vehicles and attacked CCSMR positions in Kouri Bougoudi. According to JEM 67 of its fighters were killed while CCSMR reported three dead and 12 wounded. On 3–6 February, the French Air Force conducted airstrikes on Union of Resistance Forces (UFR) troops who had launched a raid into Chad. On 9 February 2019, the Chadian army claimed to have captured 250 rebels including four leaders and destroyed forty vehicles. French Foreign Minister Jean-Yves Le Drian explained the operation by claiming that France had acted "to prevent a coup d'etat".

In addition, FACT switched its allies in Libya in 2019, aligning itself with Khalifa Haftar. The group relocated to Al Jufra Airbase, where it received training and equipment in return for its aid to Haftar's campaigns. The base also harbored mercenaries of the Russian Wagner Group, former Blackwater associates, and troops of the United Arab Emirates Armed Forces.

Death of Idriss Déby and national dialogue 

In early 2020, Haftar's Western Libya campaign failed to capture Tripoli, ultimately resulting in a ceasefire agreement in Libya. As a result, several Chadian rebel groups became free to resume their long-held plan to return to Chad. On 26 January 2021, 50 FNDJT rebels on 20 4x4 vehicles attacked Post 35 in Kouri Bougoudi 40 km south of border with Libya.

On 11 April 2021, FACT launched an offensive in Tibesti Region in the north of the country following the 2021 Chadian presidential election. President Idriss Déby was killed during the offensive on 20 April. Despite this success, the rebel offensive ultimately failed, and the government claimed victory on 9 May 2021. The Chadian presidency passed to Mahamat Déby, the son of Idriss Déby. He established the Transitional Military Council (TMC) as new governing authority, and initially refused to negotiate with insurgent groups.

Déby softened his stance in August 2021, proposing a national dialogue with the rebels. FACT expressed interest in the proposal. The discussion between the government and insurgents started in October, overseen by ex-President Goukouni Oueddei. The CCMSR and FNDJT confirmed their participation. On 29 November, the Chadian government announced an amnesty for 296 rebels and political dissidents. In January 2022, more opposition figures were released by the Chadian government.

In the following month, the TMC junta accused the UFR of trying to enlist the Wagner Group to aid them in the insurgency. In doing so, UFR leader Timane Erdimi was allegedly using middlemen in the Central African Republic. In March 2022, further peace talks were held in Doha, involving Déby's regime and several rebel groups, including FACT, MDJT, and UFDD. The peace talks made little significant progress, however, while the insurgents maintained their presence in the country's north. Amid internal disagreements, the CCMSR left the negotiations in May. In the same month, gold miners in Tibesti clashed in a battle which left over one hundred people dead; CCMSR and FACT subsequently accused the government of negligence regarding communal violence. Over 20 rebel groups officially pulled out of the Doha talks in mid-July 2022. At least some of these subsequently resumed negotiations, and a "majority" of the active insurgent factions agreed to sign a peace agreement later that month. However, some of the most powerful rebel groups including FACT refused to sign the agreement unless the government made more concessions. On 7 August 2022, Chad's military government signed a deal with 42 opposition groups. Five other rebel factions –including FACT– refused to join the agreement. UFR leader Timane Erdimi subsequently returned to Chad, officially to support the implementation of the National Dialogue.

In late August, CCMSR declared that it had killed ten soldiers in Wouri district, northern Tibesti Region. Chadian government officials admitted that rebels had made an incursion into the country, though denied the deaths of security forces.

References

2010s in Chad
2020s in Chad
2010s civil wars
2020s civil wars
Civil wars post-1945
Civil wars involving the states and peoples of Africa
Conflicts in 2016
Conflicts in 2017
Conflicts in 2018
Conflicts in 2019
Conflicts in 2020
Conflicts in 2021
Conflicts in 2022
Wars involving Chad